James Cadile (born July 16, 1940, in San Jose, California) is an American retired professional football offensive guard. He played for San Jose State College and San Jose High School. Cadile played 11 years in the National Football League all for the Chicago Bears. Cadile played for the Hawaiians of the World Football League during the 1974 and 1975 seasons. He currently resides in Medford, Oregon.

References

1940 births
Living people
Players of American football from San Jose, California
American football offensive guards
San Jose State Spartans football players
Chicago Bears players